Orcau is a locality located in the municipality of Isona i Conca Dellà, in Province of Lleida province, Catalonia, Spain. As of 2020, it has a population of 19.

Geography 
Orcau is located 106km north-northeast of Lleida.

References

Populated places in the Province of Lleida